Coop is one of Switzerland's largest retail and wholesale companies. It is structured in the form of a cooperative society with around 2.5 million members.

As of 2019, Coop operates 2,478 shops and employs more than 90,000 people in Switzerland. According to Bio Suisse, the Swiss organic producers' association, Coop accounts for half of all the organic food sold in Switzerland.  In June 2011, independent German rating agency Oekom Research awarded Coop with the title of "World's Most Sustainable Retailer". Coop has three primary brands with a sustainability selling proposition: Coop Oecoplan (various daily life products), Coop Naturaline (textile products) and Coop Naturaplan (food). The company also sells products bearing the Max Havelaar Fairtrade label.

Coop also has a low-cost product line, "Prix Garantie". Coop owns the Swiss chocolate company Halba.

Coop publishes a weekly magazine called Coopzeitung (in German), Coopération (in French) and Cooperazione (in Italian).

The chain has an online presence at coop.ch. The web site offers much of the same selection found in the Coop stores and delivers groceries, wine, flowers, books, and other products to customers in Switzerland and Liechtenstein. It currently markets its services in German, French, Italian, and English.

Summary
The Coop Group is headquartered in Switzerland and operates in the retail, wholesale, and production sectors. Coop Group operates store formats in the food, non-food and service sectors. With Transgourmet Holding AG, Coop is Europe's second largest cash & carry and wholesale supplies business. In total, the Coop Group has around 2,500 retail outlets in Switzerland and 124 cash & carry markets in Switzerland and other European countries. The Coop Group has a workforce of around 90,000.

History 

In 1864, textile industrialist Jean Jenny-Ryffel formed Switzerland's first consumer cooperative in Schwanden in the canton of Glarus. Over the next years, many other cooperative societies emerged in the country. In 1890, many of them joined together to form the Verband Schweizerischer Konsumvereine (VSK) (French: Union suisse des sociétés de consommation (USC)). In 1969, it was renamed to its current name, Coop Genossenschaft (French: Coop société coopérative; Italian: Coop società cooperativa).

In 1927, the Verband Schweizerischer Konsumvereine and the Swiss Federation of Trade Unions founded the Genossenschaftliche Zentralbank (French: Banque Centrale Coopérative; Italian: Banca Centrale Cooperativa). It became a shares company in 1970, and in 1995 was renamed Bank Coop (Banque Coop; Banca Coop). In 1999, the Basler Kantonalbank became the majority shareholder. On May 19, 2017, the institution undertook a comprehensive rebranding and became the Bank Cler (Banque Cler; Banca Cler).

Passabene (self-checkout) 
Coop was one of the first self-checkout providers in Switzerland, introducing its own system called Passabene in 2005. It is in use in 80 stores. Coop uses the MC17T Retail Mobile Computer by Motorola Solutions for this application. They later introduced mobile apps that customers can use to scan items.  As of Nov 2015, Coop point-of-sale devices accept Apple Pay, however, Coop Pronto gas station pumps do not (due to lack of NFC-capability).

Cargo Sous Terrain 
Cargo Sous Terrain (CST) is a planned underground logistics system – its first phase in the Mittelland region is scheduled by the early 2030s. As of January 2016, the company's respective association (Förderverein Cargo sous terrain) is based at the seat of Coop (Genossenschaft Basel) in Basel.

Swissmill 
Swissmill operates the largest granary in Switzerland that produces 800 tons of grain daily, representing 30% of the national grain requirements. Its flour is prepared for all bread products produced by the Swiss retailers Coop, Volg, and Landi. Although the Swissmill Tower's exterior and height in Zürich is disputed, the municipal authorities claim that the silo is intentionally designed in its aesthetically conscious way. Its external appearance is intended to express its interior –  an industrial plant.

See also 
 List of supermarket chains in Switzerland

References

External links 

Consumers' cooperatives in Switzerland
Supermarkets of Switzerland
Companies based in Basel
Retail companies established in 1890
Retail companies established in 1969
Swiss companies established in 1890
Swiss companies established in 1969